SLC22A5 is a membrane transport protein associated with primary carnitine deficiency. This protein is involved in the active cellular uptake of carnitine. It acts a symporter, moving sodium ions and other organic cations across the membrane along with carnitine. Such polyspecific organic cation transporters in the liver, kidney, intestine, and other organs are critical for the elimination of many endogenous small organic cations as well as a wide array of drugs and environmental toxins. Mutations in the SLC22A5 gene cause systemic primary carnitine deficiency, which can lead to heart failure.

Structure 
The SLC22A5 gene, containing 10 exons, is located on the q arm of chromosome 5 in position 31.1 and spans 25,910 base pair. The gene produces a 63 kDa protein composed of 557 amino acids. The protein has 12 putative transmembrane domains, with a long extracellular loop of 107 amino acids between the first two transmembrane domains and an intracellular loop between the fourth and fifth transmembrane domains. This long extracellular loop has three potential sites for N-glycosylation, and the intracellular loop has an ATP/GTP binding motif.  In putative intracellular domains, there are five potential sites for protein-kinase C-dependent phosphorylation and one for protein-kinase A-dependent phosphorylation.

Function 
The SLC22A5 gene codes for a plasma integral membrane protein which functions as both an organic cation transporter and a sodium-dependent high affinity carnitine transporter.  The encoded protein is involved in the active cellular uptake of carnitine, transporting one sodium ion with one molecule of carnitine. Organic cations transported by this protein include tetraethylammonium (TEA) without involvement of sodium. The relative uptake activity ratio of carnitine to TEA is 11.3.

Clinical Significance 
The main phenotypical effect of autosomal recessive mutations, either compound heterozygous or homozygous, in the SLC22A5 gene is systemic primary carnitine deficiency, characterized by impaired carnitine transport, urinary carnitine wasting, low serum carnitine levels, reduced intracellular carnitine accumulation, impaired beta oxidation, and cytosolic fatty acid accumulation. Patients often display metabolic decompensation, hypoketotic hypoglycemia, hepatic encephalopathy, Reye syndrome, and sudden infant death in their first year, followed by the later onset of cardiomyopathy or skeletal myopathy, arrhythmias, muscle weakness, and heart failure in early childhood. Patients may be asymptomatic, with about 70% of asymptomatic patients having a missense mutation or in-frame deletion; nonsense mutation frequency is increased in symptomatic patients. The symptoms and outcome of the disease can be drastically improved by replacement therapy with L-carnitine. The estimated incidence of primary carnitine deficiency in newborns is about 1 in 40,000.

Interactions 
SLC22A5 interacts with PDZK1.

See also 
 Solute carrier family

References

Further reading

External links 
 
 Primary Carnitine Deficiency (OCTN2 database)

Solute carrier family
Amphetamine